Roa Ridge is a bow-shaped ridge,  long in the Asgard Range of Victoria Land, Antarctica. For much of its extent, it separates Matterhorn Glacier and Lacroix Glacier. From northwest to southeast, summits on the ridge include Vogler Peak, Mount Irvine, Hoehn Peak, Webb Peak and Matterhorn. Markham Spur extends southwest from the ridge into Matterhorn Glacier.  

Both features were named by the New Zealand Geographic Board (NZGB) in 1998. Roa is a Māori word meaning "long". "Markham" refers to Geoffrey W. Markham, Secretary of the New Zealand National Committee for the International Geophysical Year, 1957–58, and first Superintendent of the Antarctic Division, New Zealand Department of Scientific and Industrial Research, 1959–65.

References

Ridges of Victoria Land
Scott Coast